César Graña (1919, Peru – August 22, 1986, Spain) was an American sociologist and anthropologist of Peruvian origin.

Graña was born in Peru, a descendant of immigrants from Andalusia, and studied at the University of San Marcos in Lima. In 1942 he emigrated to the United States, where he studied at Brown, Duke, and the University of California (UC), from which he received his Ph.D in 1957. He taught at the University of Puerto Rico, the University of Chicago College, the University of Illinois, UC Davis, UC Santa Cruz and, from 1972, UC San Diego.

Graña authored works on problems of national identity in Latin America, Nineteenth Century French bohemia, and works on the sociology of literature and art. His 1964 book Bohemian versus Bourgeois (also known as Modernity and its Discontents) is still considered an important work. His essay collection Fact and Symbol was nominated for a National Book Award.

Graña was married to Pauline Graña with whom he had two daughters. Later, he was married to Marigay Graña and had two sons. He died in a car accident on the highway between Seville and Cadiz.

Works
 Paperback title: Modernity and its Discontents (1967, New York: Harper, Row)

References

External links
Brief bio at University of California
Appreciation of César Graña by Guenther Roth, University of California 
El País article on César Graña 

1919 births
1986 deaths
Peruvian emigrants to the United States
American sociologists
Road incident deaths in Spain
20th-century American anthropologists
Brown University alumni
Duke University alumni
University of California, Berkeley alumni
University of Chicago faculty